The Children of Palomar is a comics compilation by American cartoonist Gilbert Hernandez, published in 2013.  It collects five stories originally published in 2006 and 2007 in the three-issue series New Tales of Old Palomar.

The stories and vignettes of The Children of Palomar take place in Hernandez's fictional Latin American village of Palomar, the setting of many of his early stories.  They feature many of the characters from these older stories, such as Tonantzin, Diana, Chelo, and Pipo at different times in their lives.  The narratives focus primarily on the female characters, and include elements of magic realism.

In an interview in 2007, Hernandez stated he would cease creating stories set in Palomar; he said he had "finally outgrown the place".

References

Works cited

 
 
 

2013 graphic novels
American graphic novels
Gilbert Hernandez